The Blériot 53 was a twin-engined reconnaissance biplane designed and built in France during 1915, (There is some doubt that the aircraft was actually given the designation Blériot 53). The Fuselage was partly covered with fabric leaving most of the rear fuselage un-covered, all-flying tailplane and rudder at the rear extremities, with a tail-skid underneath. To accommodate the nose down attitude when fully loaded, due to the centre of gravity coinciding with the mainwheels, there was a long skid extending from the forward fuselage. Two   Le Rhône 9C rotary engines were mounted on struts between the wings with fuel and oil tanks in the nacelles behind them. Trials were also believed to have been carried out with  Anzani 10 radial engines.

Specifications (variant specified)

References

External links

Blériot aircraft
1910s French aircraft
Biplanes
Rotary-engined aircraft
Aircraft first flown in 1915